Cesare Polacco (14 May 1900 – 2 March 1986) was an Italian actor and voice actor.

Life and career 
Born in Venice,  Polacco started his career in 1920 in the stage company of Emilio Zago, with whom he played most of the Goldoni's repertoire.  In 1928 he moved to Rome, where in addition to theatre he started appearing in films and working as a dubber. Being of Jewish origin, he was temporarily forced to abandon acting because of the 1938 Fascist racial laws, resuming his activities at the end of the war, in 1945.  Also active on radio and television, he got a large popularity thanks to the  Inspector Rock character he played in Carosello, in a series of giallo-comedy shorts  aired between  1957 and 1968.

Partial filmography 

 Loyalty of Love (1934) - Il banditore al patibolo
 Golden Arrow (1935) - Casellante stazione ferroviaria
 Lo squadrone bianco (1936) - El Fennek
 Hands Off Me! (1937) - Il capomastro
 The Former Mattia Pascal (1937) - Un ospite della pensione
 Tonight at Eleven (1938) - Il benzinaio
 A Thousand Lire a Month (1939) - Carletto, l'altro padrino
 Mad Animals (1939) - Il creditore
 The Fornaretto of Venice (1939) - Barnaba
 Torna, caro ideal! (1939) - Il medico
 Manon Lescaut (1940) - Un dei tre creditori
 La última falla (1940)
 Il signore della taverna (1940)
 Kean (1940) - Il medico
 Il ponte dei sospiri (1940)
 Il Bazar delle idee (1940)
 The Siege of the Alcazar (1940) - Venegas
 Eternal Melodies (1940) - Haydn
 Pinocchio (1940) - The Coachman (Italian version)
 La forza bruta (1941) - Paolo Perego
 The Prisoner of Santa Cruz (1941) - Sandro, suo marito
 Marco Visconti (1941)
 Merchant of Slaves (1942) - Un mercante
 Fedora (1942) - L'usuraio Barnstein
 We the Living (1942) - Member of the Epuration Commission
 O sole mio (1946)
 The Adulteress (1946) - Il vecchio dei gioielli
 Black Eagle (1946) - Il segretario Sputing
 Fury (1947) - Lawyer
 L'ebreo errante (1948)
 Fear and Sand (1948) - Banderillero
 The Earth Cries Out (1949) - Jafrem
 Buried Alive (1949) - Ferdinando
 A Night of Fame (1949) - Israelian Delegate
 Toto Looks for a House (1949) - Vice custode
 Toto the Sheik (1950) - Mohamed
 Fugitive in Trieste (1951)
 La prigioniera di Amalfi (1954)
 La campana di San Giusto (1954)
 Rigoletto e la sua tragedia (1956) - Sparafucile
 Tipi da spiaggia (1959) - Prince Joakim
 The Employee (1960) - Police Inspector Rock
 I due della legione (1962) - Police Commissioner
 The Godfather (1972) - Don Carlo Tramonti (uncredited)

References

External links 
 

1900 births
1986 deaths
Italian male film actors
Italian male television actors
Italian male stage actors
Italian male voice actors
Actors from Venice
20th-century Italian male actors